Rolando Arcadio Masferrer Rojas (1918–1975), was born on July 12, 1918, in Holguin, former Oriente Province, Cuba, better known simply as Rolando Masferrer, was a Cuban henchman, lawyer, congressman, newspaper publisher and a political activist. He was killed in Miami, United States, on October 31, 1975.

Cuba 1930s
Masferrer was a member of the Joven Cuba organization as a teenager.

Civil War Spain
He later formed part of the Abraham Lincoln Brigade in the Spanish civil war and he also was a member of Cuba's Communist Party. He was wounded in the left foot in Spain, and in Europe is said to have been an enforcer for International Brigades much feared for the thumping of his wounded gait when he approached his victim.

1940s Cuba
He was a rival of Fidel Castro in the bloody feuds of the trigger happy action groups and subject of at least one failed attempt by Castro to kill him. Masferrer also participated, with Castro, in the Cayo Confites expedition of 1947, which sought to overthrow Rafael Trujillo, the authoritarian leader of the Dominican Republic. Masferrer was elected to the Cuban House of Representatives in 1949.

1950s Cuba
Masferrer was a staunch supporter of Cuban leader Fulgencio Batista. He was not only a Senator in the Batista government but more importantly the leading founder of Los Tigres de Masferrer, a paramilitary organization set up to protect Batista from guerrilla groups and to support Batista militarily.  In this period he published two papers Tiempo in Havana and Libertad in Santiago de Cuba which insulted Francisco Franco, but without positive reaction among other leftwing Spanish Civil war exiles.

During the final years of the last Batista regime to (the end of 1958), Masferrer and his tigers operated in Oriente province; often, it is said,  out headquarters in Victoria de las Tunas, others say in Santiago, Manzanillo and Bayamo  where he had an array of exotic weapons including very lethal large caliber "air rifles."  At times his followers penetrated the Sierra Maestra with stealthy silence, terrifying some local Escopeteros who without time to react or appropriated weapons to face him fled before his forces; then the "tigres" vanished.  In this  fashion the Tigres apparently too stealthy to be opposed raided and killed throughout the foot hills of the Sierra Maestra. He is known to have threatened Franciscan priests in Manzanillo, Cuba (de Paz, pp. 81–82).  The Cuban government of Fidel Castro accused Masferrer of 2,000 killings, but also says that the Tigres were careful to remove all evidence.

Masferrer was ingenious and intelligent, he plotted to buy "La Hacienda Sevilla" and divide up the land so as to reward the local guajiros for informing on Fidel Castro in the first months of his operations in the Sierra Maestra.  This connection may or may not explain the attempted betrayal of Castro by Agrarian Organizer Eutimio Guerra.

Regardless that Masferrer had been a Communist supporter, after Fidel Castro took over Cuba's presidency on January 9, 1959, Masferrer had to abandon the island, because Castro accused him of stealing US$10 million. He left in a boat, landing in Miami.

US 1960s and 1970s
In the United States, he befriended Mafia bosses such as Santo Trafficante, as well as union leader Jimmy Hoffa. He established the 30th of November organization, with the purpose of killing Castro. Masferrer was also known for mistreating Cubans residing in Florida, extorting money from them for what he said was "to help Cuba".

On September 26, 1960, Masferrer sent an expedition of four boats to Cuba.  One boat reached Cuba, three Americans: Allan D. Thompson, Anthony Zarba and Robert O. Fuller were caught and eventually executed

In December, 1960, the Miami Herald, reported that Masferrer was leading a small group of fifty three people who were polishing their killing skills at a ranch owned by multi-millionaire Howard Hughes. Masferrer might have intended to hire a few of them for his organization.

In the early 1960s, Masferrer was associated with El Tiempo, a Spanish-language newspaper, edited by S. Ross, in New York City.

In 1961, Masferrer met with President John F. Kennedy, presumably to talk about Castro and the situation in Cuba. But Kennedy disliked Masferrer's radical and fanatical personality, and the two never established any publicly known conversation after that.

In the 1960s Masferrer plotted and accumulated weapons to invade Haiti so as to have a base, free of US law, to attack the Castro government of Cuba which had foiled direct attempts to land. Masferrer was killed by a car bomb in 1975. Fidel Castro arranged the attack, and it was carried out by Colonel Rodriguez, a member of Cuban Contra-intelligence.

Notes

References

Morán Arce, Lucas 1980 La revolución cubana, 1953-1959: Una versión rebelde Imprenta Universitaria, Universidad Católica;

de Paz-Sánchez, Manuel 2001. Zona de Guerra. España ante la Revolución Cubana. Litografía Romero. S.A. Santa Cruz de Tenerife, Canary Islands, Spain 

Ros, Enrique 2003 Fidel Castro y El Gatillo Alegre: Sus Años Universitarios (Coleccion Cuba y Sus Jueces) Ediciones Universal Miami 

1918 births
1975 deaths
Opposition to Fidel Castro
Deaths by car bomb in the United States
Exiles of the Cuban Revolution in the United States
Abraham Lincoln Brigade members
People murdered in Florida
Male murder victims